Stogi may refer to the following places in Poland:
Stogi, Lower Silesian Voivodeship (south-west Poland)
Stogi, Greater Poland Voivodeship (west-central Poland)
Stogi, Pomeranian Voivodeship (north Poland)